Killer is a British television series which was originally broadcast on ITV in 1984. It consisted of three stand-alone episodes, produced by Yorkshire Television.

Episodes
 Killer Waiting (17 February 1984) featuring John Thaw and Diane Keen. Directed by Michael Ferguson.
 Killer Exposed (24 February 1984) featuring Anthony Valentine and Dearbhla Molloy
 Killer Contract (2 March 1984) featuring Edward Woodward and Wanda Ventham

References

Bibliography
 Maxford, Howard. Hammer Complete: The Films, the Personnel, the Company. McFarland, 2018.
 Singer, Michael. Film Directors: A Complete Guide. Watson-Guptill Publications, Incorporated, 1993.

External links
 
 
 

1984 British television series debuts
1984 British television series endings
1980s British drama television series
ITV television dramas
English-language television shows
Television series by Yorkshire Television